Ami language may refer to:
Amis language (Taiwan)
Ame language (Australia)